I Found Joe Barton, also known as The Adventures of Al Munch, was a 1952 film made for American television starring Bud Tingwell and Lloyd Berrell. The first Australian drama show made specifically for television, it was the pilot for a series which did not eventuate called The Adventures of Al Munch. However it screened in some cinemas.

Plot
Al Munch (Bud Tingwell) is an American private eye who served in Sydney during World War II and decided to stay on. He is hired by Hollywood film producer, Frankoff, to find Joe Barton, an American crime figure thought to be dead but who is now said to be alive in Australia. Frankof has made a film of his life but needs a clearance from Barton before he can release it and hires Munch to locate him.

Munch contacts a lawyer, Timothy O'Leary, to find Barton, but then O'Leary is murdered. Munch discovers Barton and hands him over to the police for O'Leary's murder.

Cast
Bud Tingwell as Al Munch
Lloyd Berrell
Margo Lee

Production
The series was the brainchild of American radio producer Grace Gibson, who was the largest packager of radio drama in Sydney. Although television was not introduced in Australia until 1956, she wanted to make a show for the American market using an Australian cast and crew, but American writers and directors. There were a number of Australian radio serials at the time about American characters.

Gibson originally got Ken G. Hall to direct Alan White in a test scene and sent to it some American colleagues but they were not impressed. American director Francis D. Lyon was flown out to do tests with Joe McCormick, Ken Wayne, White and Bud Tingwell. Tingwell was eventually cast and the film was shot over ten days.

There was emphasis on Australian flora and fauna: Frankof has a pet koala in his room, Munch travels by boat across Sydney harbour, there are plenty of gum trees and kangaroos.

Reception
The series did not sell to American television. Tingwell claims this is because they wanted Gibson to guarantee 39 episodes in 39 weeks and she was not sure she would be able to fulfil this order.

However, it did sell to an American distributor and play as a self-contained episode on independent TV stations in the US. In Australia it screened as a support feature in cinemas.

In 1952 Charles Tingwell wrote a letter to a newspaper claiming the sale of old Australian films to US television would be bad for Australia's reputation.

References

External links
Al Munch at National Film and Sound Archive

1952 films
1952 television films
Australian television films
1950s English-language films